MacDonald Farm is a historic farm complex located at Meredith in Delaware County, New York, United States. The complex consists of the main farm house, a hops barn now used as a garage, privy, smokehouse, incubator shed, barn, straw barn, creamery, mill building, and two residences built for married hired hands.  The farm house was built in 1851 and most of the buildings were built between 1870 and 1900.

It was listed on the National Register of Historic Places in 1973.

See also
National Register of Historic Places listings in Delaware County, New York

References

Houses on the National Register of Historic Places in New York (state)
National Register of Historic Places in Delaware County, New York
Houses completed in 1851
Houses in Delaware County, New York
1851 establishments in New York (state)